David C. Damschen is an American politician from the state of Utah. A member of the Republican Party, Damschen was the Utah State Treasurer.

Damschen worked for American West Bank and U.S. Bank, and then became the chief deputy to Richard Ellis, the Utah State Treasurer, in 2009. When Ellis resigned in 2015, Governor Gary Herbert appointed Damschen to succeed Ellis. He was sworn into office in January 2016. Damschen defeated Neil Hansen in the 2016 election to a full term. In 2018, he was voted senior vice president of the National Association of State Treasurers. In April 2021, just months after winning reelection to a second full term, Damschen announced his resignation, effective 30 April, to become President and CEO of the Utah Housing Corporation.

References

Living people
State treasurers of Utah
Utah Republicans
University of Washington alumni
Year of birth missing (living people)